In physics, the fundamental interactions, also known as fundamental forces, are the interactions that do not appear to be reducible to more basic interactions. There are four fundamental interactions known to exist:  the gravitational and electromagnetic interactions, which produce significant long-range  forces whose effects can be seen directly in everyday life, and the strong and weak interactions, which produce forces at minuscule, subatomic distances and govern nuclear interactions. Some scientists hypothesize that a fifth force might exist, but these hypotheses remain speculative.

Each of the known fundamental interactions can be described mathematically as a field. The gravitational force is attributed to the curvature of spacetime, described by Einstein's general theory of relativity. The other three are discrete quantum fields, and their interactions are mediated by elementary particles described by the Standard Model of particle physics.

Within the Standard Model, the strong  interaction is carried by a particle called the gluon and is responsible for quarks binding together to form hadrons, such as protons and neutrons.  As a residual effect, it creates the nuclear force that binds the latter particles to form atomic nuclei. The weak interaction is carried by particles called W and Z bosons, and also acts on the nucleus of atoms, mediating radioactive decay.  The electromagnetic force, carried by the photon, creates electric and magnetic fields, which are responsible for the attraction between orbital electrons and atomic nuclei which holds atoms together, as well as chemical bonding and electromagnetic waves, including visible light, and forms the basis for electrical technology. Although the electromagnetic force is far stronger than  gravity, it tends to cancel itself out within large objects, so over large (astronomical) distances gravity tends to be the dominant force, and is responsible for holding together the large scale structures in the universe, such as planets, stars, and galaxies.

Many theoretical physicists believe these fundamental forces to be related and to become unified into a single force at very high energies on a minuscule scale, the Planck scale, but particle accelerators cannot produce the enormous energies required to experimentally probe this. Devising a common theoretical framework that would explain the relation between the forces in a single theory is perhaps the greatest goal of today's theoretical physicists. The weak and electromagnetic forces have already been unified with the electroweak theory of Sheldon Glashow, Abdus Salam, and Steven Weinberg, for which they received the 1979 Nobel Prize in physics. Some physicists seek to unite the electroweak and strong fields within what is called a Grand Unified Theory (GUT). An even bigger challenge is to find a way to quantize the gravitational field, resulting in a theory of quantum gravity (QG) which would unite gravity in a common theoretical framework with the other three forces. Some theories, notably string theory, seek both QG and GUT within one framework, unifying all four fundamental interactions along with mass generation within a theory of everything (ToE).

History

Classical theory
In his 1687 theory, Isaac Newton postulated space as an infinite and unalterable physical structure existing before, within, and around all objects while their states and relations unfold at a constant pace everywhere, thus absolute space and time. Inferring that all objects bearing mass approach at a constant rate, but collide by impact proportional to their masses, Newton inferred that matter exhibits an attractive force. His law of universal gravitation implied there to be instant interaction among all objects. As conventionally interpreted, Newton's theory of motion modelled a central force without a communicating medium. Thus Newton's theory violated the tradition, going back to Descartes, that there should be no action at a distance. Conversely, during the 1820s, when explaining magnetism, Michael Faraday inferred a field filling space and transmitting that force. Faraday conjectured that ultimately, all forces unified into one.

In 1873, James Clerk Maxwell unified electricity and magnetism as effects of an electromagnetic field whose third consequence was light, travelling at constant speed in vacuum. If his electromagnetic field theory held true in all inertial frames of reference, this would contradict Newton's theory of motion, which relied on Galilean relativity. If, instead, his field theory only applied to reference frames at rest relative to a mechanical luminiferous aether—presumed to fill all space whether within matter or in vacuum and to manifest the electromagnetic field—then it could be reconciled with Galilean relativity and Newton's laws. (However, such a "Maxwell aether" was later disproven; Newton's laws did, in fact, have to be replaced.)

The Standard Model
 

The Standard Model of particle physics was developed throughout the latter half of the 20th century. In the Standard Model, the electromagnetic, strong, and weak interactions associate with elementary particles, whose behaviours are modelled in quantum mechanics (QM). For predictive success with QM's probabilistic outcomes, particle physics conventionally models QM events across a field set to special relativity, altogether relativistic quantum field theory (QFT). Force particles, called gauge bosons—force carriers or messenger particles of underlying fields—interact with matter particles, called fermions. Everyday matter is atoms, composed of three fermion types: up-quarks and down-quarks constituting, as well as electrons orbiting, the atom's nucleus. Atoms interact, form molecules, and manifest further properties through electromagnetic interactions among their electrons absorbing and emitting photons, the electromagnetic field's force carrier, which if unimpeded traverse potentially infinite distance. Electromagnetism's QFT is quantum electrodynamics (QED).

The force carriers of the weak interaction are the massive W and Z bosons. Electroweak theory (EWT) covers both electromagnetism and the weak interaction. At the high temperatures shortly after the Big Bang, the weak interaction, the electromagnetic interaction, and the Higgs boson were originally mixed components of a different set of ancient pre-symmetry-breaking fields. As the early universe cooled, these fields split into the long-range electromagnetic interaction, the short-range weak interaction, and the Higgs boson. In the Higgs mechanism, the Higgs field manifests Higgs bosons that interact with some quantum particles in a way that endows those particles with mass. The strong interaction, whose force carrier is the gluon, traversing minuscule distance among quarks, is modeled in quantum chromodynamics (QCD). EWT, QCD, and the Higgs mechanism comprise particle physics' Standard Model (SM). Predictions are usually made using calculational approximation methods, although such perturbation theory is inadequate to model some experimental observations (for instance bound states and solitons). Still, physicists widely accept the Standard Model as science's most experimentally confirmed theory.

Beyond the Standard Model, some theorists work to unite the electroweak and strong interactions within a Grand Unified Theory (GUT). Some attempts at GUTs hypothesize "shadow" particles, such that every known matter particle associates with an undiscovered force particle, and vice versa, altogether supersymmetry (SUSY). Other theorists seek to quantize the gravitational field by the modelling behaviour of its hypothetical force carrier, the graviton and achieve quantum gravity (QG). One approach to QG is loop quantum gravity (LQG). Still other theorists seek both QG and GUT within one framework, reducing all four fundamental interactions to a Theory of Everything (ToE). The most prevalent aim at a ToE is string theory, although to model matter particles, it added SUSY to force particles—and so, strictly speaking, became superstring theory. Multiple, seemingly disparate superstring theories were unified on a backbone, M-theory. Theories beyond the Standard Model remain highly speculative, lacking great experimental support.

Overview of the fundamental interactions

In the conceptual model of fundamental interactions, matter consists of fermions, which carry properties called charges and spin ± (intrinsic angular momentum ±, where ħ is the reduced Planck constant). They attract or repel each other by exchanging bosons.

The interaction of any pair of fermions in perturbation theory can then be modelled thus:

 Two fermions go in → interaction by boson exchange → Two changed fermions go out.

The exchange of bosons always carries energy and momentum between the fermions, thereby changing their speed and direction. The exchange may also transport a charge between the fermions, changing the charges of the fermions in the process (e.g., turn them from one type of fermion to another). Since bosons carry one unit of angular momentum, the fermion's spin direction will flip from + to − (or vice versa) during such an exchange (in units of the reduced Planck's constant). Since such interactions result in a change in momentum, they can give rise to classical Newtonian forces. In quantum mechanics, physicists often use the terms "force" and "interaction" interchangeably; for example, the weak interaction is sometimes referred to as the "weak force".

According to the present understanding, there are four fundamental interactions or forces: gravitation, electromagnetism, the weak interaction, and the strong interaction. Their magnitude and behaviour vary greatly, as described in the table below. Modern physics attempts to explain every observed physical phenomenon by these fundamental interactions. Moreover, reducing the number of different interaction types is seen as desirable. Two cases in point are the unification of:
Electric and magnetic force into electromagnetism;
The electromagnetic interaction and the weak interaction into the electroweak interaction; see below.

Both magnitude ("relative strength") and "range" of the associated potential, as given in the table, are meaningful only within a rather complex theoretical framework. The table below lists properties of a conceptual scheme that remains the subject of ongoing research.

The modern (perturbative) quantum mechanical view of the fundamental forces other than gravity is that particles of matter (fermions) do not directly interact with each other, but rather carry a charge, and exchange virtual particles (gauge bosons), which are the interaction carriers or force mediators. For example, photons mediate the interaction of electric charges, and gluons mediate the interaction of color charges. The full theory includes perturbations beyond simply fermions exchanging bosons; these additional perturbations can involve bosons that exchange fermions, as well as the creation or destruction of particles: see Feynman diagrams for examples.

The interactions

Gravity

Gravitation is by far the weakest of the four interactions at the atomic scale, where electromagnetic interactions dominate. But the idea that the weakness of gravity can easily be demonstrated by suspending a pin using a simple magnet (such as a refrigerator magnet) is fundamentally flawed. The only reason the magnet is able to hold the pin against the gravitational pull of the entire Earth is due to its relative proximity. There is clearly a short distance of separation between magnet and pin where a breaking point is reached, and due to the large mass of Earth this distance is quite small.

Gravitation is the most important of the four fundamental forces for astronomical objects over astronomical distances for two reasons. First, gravitation has an infinite effective range, like electromagnetism but unlike the strong and weak interactions. Second, gravity always attracts and never repels; in contrast, astronomical bodies tend toward a near-neutral net electric charge, such that the attraction to one type of charge and the repulsion from the opposite charge mostly cancel each other out.

Even though electromagnetism is far stronger than gravitation, electrostatic attraction is not relevant for large celestial bodies, such as planets, stars, and galaxies, simply because such bodies contain equal numbers of protons and electrons and so have a net electric charge of zero. Nothing "cancels" gravity, since it is only attractive, unlike electric forces which can be attractive or repulsive. On the other hand, all objects having mass are subject to the gravitational force, which only attracts. Therefore, only gravitation matters on the large-scale structure of the universe.

The long range of gravitation makes it responsible for such large-scale phenomena as the structure of galaxies and black holes and it retards the expansion of the universe. Gravitation also explains astronomical phenomena on more modest scales, such as planetary orbits, as well as everyday experience: objects fall; heavy objects act as if they were glued to the ground, and animals can only jump so high.

Gravitation was the first interaction to be described mathematically. In ancient times, Aristotle hypothesized that objects of different masses fall at different rates. During the Scientific Revolution, Galileo Galilei experimentally determined that this hypothesis was wrong under certain circumstances — neglecting the friction due to air resistance and buoyancy forces if an atmosphere is present (e.g. the case of a dropped air-filled balloon vs a water-filled balloon), all objects accelerate toward the Earth at the same rate. Isaac Newton's law of Universal Gravitation (1687) was a good approximation of the behaviour of gravitation. Our present-day understanding of gravitation stems from Einstein's General Theory of Relativity of 1915, a more accurate (especially for cosmological masses and distances) description of gravitation in terms of the geometry of spacetime.

Merging general relativity and quantum mechanics (or quantum field theory) into a more general theory of quantum gravity is an area of active research. It is hypothesized that gravitation is mediated by a massless spin-2 particle called the graviton.

Although general relativity has been experimentally confirmed (at least for weak fields, i.e. not black holes) on all but the smallest scales, there are Alternatives to general relativity. These theories must reduce to general relativity in some limit, and the focus of observational work is to establish limits on what deviations from general relativity are possible.

Proposed extra dimensions could explain why the gravity force is so weak.

Electroweak interaction

Electromagnetism and weak interaction appear to be very different at everyday low energies. They can be modeled using two different theories. However, above unification energy, on the order of 100 GeV, they would merge into a single electroweak force.

The electroweak theory is very important for modern cosmology, particularly on how the universe evolved. This is because shortly after the Big Bang, when the temperature was still above approximately 1015 K, the electromagnetic force and the weak force were still merged as a combined electroweak force.

For contributions to the unification of the weak and electromagnetic interaction between elementary particles, Abdus Salam, Sheldon Glashow and Steven Weinberg were awarded the Nobel Prize in Physics in 1979.

Electromagnetism

Electromagnetism is the force that acts between electrically charged particles. This phenomenon includes the electrostatic force acting between charged particles at rest, and the combined effect of electric and magnetic forces acting between charged particles moving relative to each other.

Electromagnetism has an infinite range like gravity, but is vastly stronger than it, and therefore describes several macroscopic phenomena of everyday experience such as friction, rainbows, lightning, and all human-made devices using electric current, such as television, lasers, and computers. Electromagnetism fundamentally determines all macroscopic, and many atomic-level, properties of the chemical elements, including all chemical bonding.

In a four kilogram (~1 gallon) jug of water, there is

of total electron charge. Thus, if we place two such jugs a meter apart, the electrons in one of the jugs repel those in the other jug with a force of

This force is many times larger than the weight of the planet Earth. The atomic nuclei in one jug also repel those in the other with the same force. However, these repulsive forces are canceled by the attraction of the electrons in jug A with the nuclei in jug B and the attraction of the nuclei in jug A with the electrons in jug B, resulting in no net force. Electromagnetic forces are tremendously stronger than gravity but cancel out so that for large bodies gravity dominates.

Electrical and magnetic phenomena have been observed since ancient times, but it was only in the 19th century James Clerk Maxwell discovered that electricity and magnetism are two aspects of the same fundamental interaction. By 1864, Maxwell's equations had rigorously quantified this unified interaction. Maxwell's theory, restated using vector calculus, is the classical theory of electromagnetism, suitable for most technological purposes.

The constant speed of light in vacuum (customarily denoted with a lowercase letter ) can be derived from Maxwell's equations, which are consistent with the theory of special relativity. Albert Einstein's 1905 theory of special relativity, however, which follows from the observation that the speed of light is constant no matter how fast the observer is moving, showed that the theoretical result implied by Maxwell's equations has profound implications far beyond electromagnetism on the very nature of time and space.

In another work that departed from classical electro-magnetism, Einstein also explained the photoelectric effect by utilizing Max Planck's discovery that light was transmitted in 'quanta' of specific energy content based on the frequency, which we now call photons. Starting around 1927, Paul Dirac combined quantum mechanics with the relativistic theory of electromagnetism. Further work in the 1940s, by Richard Feynman, Freeman Dyson, Julian Schwinger, and Sin-Itiro Tomonaga, completed this theory, which is now called quantum electrodynamics, the revised theory of electromagnetism. Quantum electrodynamics and quantum mechanics provide a theoretical basis for electromagnetic behavior such as quantum tunneling, in which a certain percentage of electrically charged particles move in ways that would be impossible under the classical electromagnetic theory, that is necessary for everyday electronic devices such as transistors to function.

Weak interaction

The weak interaction or weak nuclear force is responsible for some nuclear phenomena such as beta decay. Electromagnetism and the weak force are now understood to be two aspects of a unified electroweak interaction — this discovery was the first step toward the unified theory known as the Standard Model. In the theory of the electroweak interaction, the carriers of the weak force are the massive gauge bosons called the W and Z bosons. The weak interaction is the only known interaction that does not conserve parity; it is left–right asymmetric. The weak interaction even violates CP symmetry but does conserve CPT.

Strong interaction

The strong interaction, or strong nuclear force, is the most complicated interaction, mainly because of the way it varies with distance. The nuclear force is powerfully attractive between nucleons at distances of about 1 femtometre (fm, or 10−15 metres), but it rapidly decreases to insignificance at distances beyond about 2.5 fm. At distances less than 0.7 fm, the nuclear force becomes repulsive. This repulsive component is responsible for the physical size of nuclei, since the nucleons can come no closer than the force allows.

After the nucleus was discovered in 1908, it was clear that a new force, today known as the nuclear force, was needed to overcome the electrostatic repulsion, a manifestation of electromagnetism, of the positively charged protons. Otherwise, the nucleus could not exist. Moreover, the force had to be strong enough to squeeze the protons into a volume whose diameter is about 10−15 m, much smaller than that of the entire atom. From the short range of this force, Hideki Yukawa predicted that it was associated with a massive force particle, whose mass is approximately 100 MeV.

The 1947 discovery of the pion ushered in the modern era of particle physics. Hundreds of hadrons were discovered from the 1940s to 1960s, and an extremely complicated theory of hadrons as strongly interacting particles was developed. Most notably:
The pions were understood to be oscillations of vacuum condensates;
Jun John Sakurai proposed the rho and omega vector bosons to be force carrying particles for approximate symmetries of isospin and hypercharge;
Geoffrey Chew, Edward K. Burdett and Steven Frautschi grouped the heavier hadrons into families that could be understood as vibrational and rotational excitations of strings.

While each of these approaches offered  insights, no approach led directly to a fundamental theory.

Murray Gell-Mann along with George Zweig first proposed fractionally charged quarks in 1961. Throughout the 1960s, different authors considered theories similar to the modern fundamental theory of quantum chromodynamics (QCD) as simple models for the interactions of quarks. The first to hypothesize the gluons of QCD were  Moo-Young Han and Yoichiro Nambu, who introduced the quark color charge. Han and Nambu hypothesized that it might be associated with a force-carrying field. At that time, however, it was difficult to see how such a model could permanently confine quarks. Han and Nambu also assigned each quark color an integer electrical charge, so that the quarks were fractionally charged only on average, and they did not expect the quarks in their model to be permanently confined.

In 1971, Murray Gell-Mann and Harald Fritzsch proposed that the Han/Nambu color gauge field was the correct theory of the short-distance interactions of fractionally charged quarks. A little later, David Gross, Frank Wilczek, and David Politzer discovered that this theory had the property of asymptotic freedom, allowing them to make contact with experimental evidence. They concluded that QCD was the complete theory of the strong interactions, correct at all distance scales. The discovery of asymptotic freedom led most physicists to accept QCD since it became clear that even the long-distance properties of the strong interactions could be consistent with experiment if the quarks are permanently confined: the strong force increases indefinitely with distance, trapping quarks inside the hadrons.

Assuming that quarks are confined, Mikhail Shifman, Arkady Vainshtein and Valentine Zakharov were able to compute the properties of many low-lying hadrons directly from QCD, with only a few extra parameters to describe the vacuum. In 1980, Kenneth G. Wilson published computer calculations based on the first principles of QCD, establishing, to a level of confidence tantamount to certainty, that QCD will confine quarks. Since then, QCD has been the established theory of strong interactions.

QCD is a theory of fractionally charged quarks interacting by means of 8 bosonic particles called gluons. The gluons also interact with each other, not just with the quarks, and at long distances the lines of force collimate into strings, loosely modeled by a linear potential, a constant attractive force. In this way, the mathematical theory of QCD not only explains how quarks interact over short distances but also the string-like behavior, discovered by Chew and Frautschi, which they manifest over longer distances.

Higgs interaction
Conventionally, the Higgs interaction is not counted among the four fundamental forces.

Nonetheless, although not a gauge interaction nor generated by any diffeomorphism symmetry, the Higgs field's cubic Yukawa coupling produces a weakly attractive fifth interaction.  After spontaneous symmetry breaking via the Higgs mechanism, Yukawa terms remain of the form

,

with Yukawa coupling , particle mass  (in eV), and Higgs vacuum expectation value .  Hence coupled particles can exchange a virtual Higgs boson, yielding classical potentials of the form

,

with Higgs mass . Because the reduced Compton wavelength of the Higgs boson is so small (comparable to the W and Z bosons), this potential has an effective range of a few attometers.  Between two electrons, it begins roughly 1011 times weaker than the weak interaction, and grows exponentially weaker at non-zero distances.

Beyond the Standard Model

Numerous theoretical efforts have been made to systematize the existing four fundamental interactions on the model of electroweak unification.

Grand Unified Theories (GUTs) are proposals to show that the three fundamental interactions described by the Standard Model are all different manifestations of a single interaction with symmetries that break down and create separate interactions below some extremely high level of energy. GUTs are also expected to predict some of the relationships between constants of nature that the Standard Model treats as unrelated, as well as predicting gauge coupling unification for the relative strengths of the electromagnetic, weak, and strong forces (this was, for example, verified at the Large Electron–Positron Collider in 1991 for supersymmetric theories).

Theories of everything, which integrate GUTs with a quantum gravity theory face a greater barrier, because no quantum gravity theories, which include string theory, loop quantum gravity, and twistor theory, have secured wide acceptance. Some theories look for a graviton to complete the Standard Model list of force-carrying particles, while others, like loop quantum gravity, emphasize the possibility that time-space itself may have a quantum aspect to it.

Some theories beyond the Standard Model include a hypothetical fifth force, and the search for such a force is an ongoing line of experimental physics research. In supersymmetric theories, some particles acquire their masses only through supersymmetry breaking effects and these particles, known as moduli, can mediate new forces. Another reason to look for new forces is the discovery that the expansion of the universe is accelerating (also known as dark energy), giving rise to a need to explain a nonzero cosmological constant, and possibly to other modifications of general relativity. Fifth forces have also been suggested to explain phenomena such as CP violations, dark matter, and dark flow.

See also

 Quintessence, a hypothesized fifth force.
 Gerardus 't Hooft
 Edward Witten
 Howard Georgi

References

Bibliography
 2nd ed.

 While all interactions are discussed, discussion is especially thorough on the weak.